Edward "Ed" Giacomin (born June 6, 1939) is a Canadian retired professional ice hockey goaltender who played for the New York Rangers and Detroit Red Wings in the National Hockey League between 1965 and 1978.

Playing career
Giacomin began his professional career in 1959 when he played four games for the Washington Presidents of the Eastern Hockey League. The Eagles had originally sought his brother Rollie, but work commitments meant he was unable to play, so suggested Eddie instead. Giacomin followed that with brief stints with the Clinton Comets in 1958–59 and 1959–60. Despite suffering serious burns in a kitchen accident, Giacomin made the roster of the Providence Reds in the 1960–61 season. In the Original Six days of the 1960s, with only six starting goaltending jobs in the NHL, positions were hard to obtain, and Giacomin starred for the Reds for five full seasons.

NHL teams, particularly the Detroit Red Wings and the New York Rangers, began to express interest in Giacomin. New York traded three players and starting goaltender Marcel Paille to the Reds for Giacomin in 1965. He was impressive in his first month with the Rangers, but faltered thereafter, and lost the starting job. The following season he improved markedly; he led the NHL in shutouts and backstopped the Rangers to their second playoff berth in nine seasons.

A classic stand-up goaltender and a skilled stickhandler known for leaving the crease to play the puck, Giacomin was the Rangers' starting goaltender for the next nine seasons. He led the league in games played for four straight years from 1967 to 1970 and in shutouts in 1967, 1968 and 1971.  In 1971 he shared the Vezina Trophy with teammate Gilles Villemure. Typical of his competitive nature, in a game in the 1971 playoffs against Chicago, when Bobby Hull skated over the back of his hand, Giacomin continued to play, and when the Rangers won the game, even the Black Hawks used the word "guts" to describe his determination. The Rangers went on to meet the Boston Bruins in the Stanley Cup finals in 1972, losing in a hard-fought six-game series.

Giacomin's effectiveness was reduced in 1975 by injuries. The following season, the Rangers got off to their worst start in ten years (they would miss the playoffs for the first time in a decade) and began to get rid of their high-salaried veterans, Giacomin among them. Many fans were angry when he was put on waivers and claimed by the Detroit Red Wings on October 29, 1975, as the result of a youth movement that resulted in John Davidson taking over in goal. The Red Wings' next game was in New York on November 2, and when Giacomin appeared on the ice in a Red Wing jersey, fans gave him a long standing ovation and cheered for him throughout the game. Rangers fans booed their own team when they took shots or scored on Giacomin, and chanted Giacomin's name throughout the match, which he won for the Red Wings. The evening was voted one of the 50 greatest moments in MSG history.

He played three respectable seasons for Detroit before a youth movement took over. He retired on January 17, 1978, with a career record of 289-208-97 and a 2.82 GAA.

Retirement
Giacomin spent the 1979 season as a broadcaster for the New York Islanders, who were beaten in the playoffs by the rival Rangers that spring.  Giacomin later served with the Islanders and the Red Wings as an assistant coach and two stints with the Rangers as a goaltending coach.

He was inducted into the Hockey Hall of Fame in 1987. His jersey number 1 was the second number retired by the Rangers, on March 15, 1989, joining Rod Gilbert's number 7 that was retired by the Rangers on October 14, 1979.

Achievements and facts
 Named to the NHL First All-Star Team in 1967 and 1971.
 Named to the NHL Second All-Star Team in 1968, 1969 and 1970
 Played in NHL All-Star Game in 1967, 1968, 1969, 1970, 1971 and 1973
 Vezina Trophy winner in 1971 (shared with Gilles Villemure)
 Ranked 25th in career wins by a goaltender with 289
 Ranked 19th in career shutouts with 54
 His No. 1 was the second jersey number retired by the New York Rangers, on March 15, 1989
 In the 2009 book 100 Ranger Greats, was ranked No. 6 all-time of the 901 New York Rangers  (and ranked second highest of the 74 who were goaltenders) who had played during the team's first 82 seasons
 Inducted into the Hockey Hall of Fame in 1987

Career statistics

Regular season and playoffs

References

 Eddie, A Goalie's Story (Atheneum, 1976) by Hugh Delano

External links
 

1939 births
Living people
Baltimore Clippers players
Canadian expatriate ice hockey players in the United States
Canadian ice hockey goaltenders
Clinton Comets players
Detroit Red Wings players
Hockey Hall of Fame inductees
Ice hockey people from Ontario
Montreal Royals (EPHL) players
National Hockey League broadcasters
National Hockey League players with retired numbers
New York Rangers players
New York Rovers players
Providence Reds players
Sportspeople from Greater Sudbury
Vezina Trophy winners
Washington Presidents players